Volcán de Fuego  (Spanish for "Volcano of Fire", often shortened to Fuego) or Chi Q'aq' (Kaqchikel for "where the fire is") is an active stratovolcano in Guatemala, on the borders of Chimaltenango, Escuintla and Sacatepéquez departments. It has erupted frequently since the Spanish conquest, most recently in June and November 2018, 23 September 2021, and 11 December 2022.

Fuego is famous for being almost constantly active at a low level. Small gas and ash eruptions occur every 15 to 20 minutes, but larger eruptions are rare. Andesite and basalt lava types dominate, and recent eruptions have tended to be more mafic than older ones.

The volcano is joined with Acatenango and collectively the complex is known as La Horqueta.

Early expeditions
In 1881, French writer Eugenio Dussaussay climbed the volcano, then practically unexplored. First, he needed to ask for permission to climb from the Sacatepéquez governor, who gave him a letter for the Alotenango mayor asking for his assistance with guides to help the explorer and his companion, Tadeo Trabanino.  They wanted to climb the central peak, unexplored at the time, but could not find a guide and had to climb to the active cone, which had a recent eruption in 1880.

British archeologist Alfred Percival Maudslay climbed the volcano on 7 January 1892.  Here is how he described his expedition:

Notable eruptions

1717 destruction of Santiago de los Caballeros

The strongest earthquakes experienced by the city of Santiago de los Caballeros before its final move in 1776 were the San Miguel earthquakes in 1717. In the city, people also believed that the proximity of the Volcán de Fuego (English: Volcano of Fire) was the cause of earthquakes; the great architect Diego de Porres even said that all the earthquakes were caused by volcano explosions.

On 27 August there was a strong eruption of Volcán de Fuego, which lasted until 30 August; the residents of the city asked for help to Santo Cristo of the cathedral and to the Virgen del Socorro who were sworn patrons of the Volcan de Fuego. On 29 August a Virgen del Rosario procession took to the streets after a century without leaving her temple, and there were many more holy processions until 29 September, the day of San Miguel. Early afternoon earthquakes were minor, but at about 7:00 pm there was a strong earthquake that forced residents to leave their homes; tremors and rumblings followed until four o'clock. The neighbors took to the streets and loudly confessed their sins, bracing for the worst.

The San Miguel earthquake damaged the city considerably, to the point that some rooms and walls of the Royal Palace were destroyed. There was also a partial abandonment of the city, food shortages, lack of manpower and extensive damage to the city infrastructure; not to mention numerous dead and injured. These earthquakes made the authorities consider moving to a new city less prone to seismic activity. City residents strongly opposed the move, and even took to the Royal Palace in protest; in the end, the city did not move, but the number of elements in the Army Battalion to safeguard the order was considerable. The damage to the palace was repaired by Diego de Porres, who finished repairs in 1720; although there are indications that there were more jobs done by Porres until 1736.

In 1773, the Santa Marta earthquakes destroyed much of the town, which led to the third change in location for the city. The Spanish Crown ordered, in 1776, the removal of the capital to a safer location, the Valley of the Shrine, where Guatemala City, the modern capital of Guatemala, now stands. This new city did not retain its old name and was christened Nueva Guatemala de la Asunción (New Guatemala of the Assumption), and its patron saint is Our Lady of the Assumption. The badly damaged city of Santiago de los Caballeros was ordered abandoned, although not everyone left, and was thereafter referred to as la Antigua Guatemala (the Old Guatemala).

Eruption of 3 June 2018

Volcán de Fuego is one of the world's most active volcanos, and also happens to be near dense human population centers. Additionally the eruption pattern for this volcano includes rapid onset (paroxysmal) eruptions, which have the potential of sometimes making timely evacuations of the surrounding area difficult or impossible, given the current state of volcanology science. Beginning in 2002, the Volcán de Fuego entered a new active period, with more or less continuous activity, interspersed with monthly eruptive episodes. These episodes would typically send ash falling on communities within 20 km of the volcano, and lava flows about 1–2 km from the summit, and the occasional pyroclastic density current.

On 3 June 2018, the volcano suddenly produced its most powerful eruption since 1974. Large pyroclastic density currents were produced that over-topped the barranca boundaries they had previously been confined to and unexpectedly hit El Rodeo, Las Lajas, San Miguel Los Lotes, and La Reunión villages in Escuintla, which buried the towns and killed many of the surprised residents. Later, 18 bodies were found in the village of San Miguel Los Lotes. 
Members of the Shriners International fraternity met six of over fifty burned children, ages 1–16, that were sent from Guatemala to the Shriners Hospital in Galveston, Texas and accompanied by 5 guardians for receiving the appropriate and medical treatment.

Ash fall extended as far as the capital, Guatemala City forcing the closure of La Aurora International Airport. 
The military assisted in clearing ash off of the runway. Rescue attempts were seriously hampered as routes into the affected regions were seriously damaged by the pyroclastic density currents.
On 5 June, Associated Press reported that at least 99 people are dead and nearly 200 others unaccounted for following the eruption, while some Shriners hospitals were activated for new entries.

Gallery

See also
 
 List of volcanoes in Guatemala
 List of volcanic eruptions by death toll

References

Bibliography

External links

 Map to Volcano
 Global Volcanism Program
 YouTube Video of the eruption on 3 June 2018

Volcan de Fuego
Sierra Madre de Chiapas
Stratovolcanoes of Guatemala
Subduction volcanoes
Active volcanoes
Volcan de Fuego
Volcan de Fuego
VEI-4 volcanoes